Without Motive is a British crime drama series broadcast on ITV, starring Ross Kemp as the main protagonist, Detective Constable Jack Mowbray, a born and bred Bristol detective whose world is turned upside down when he is assigned to a major murder enquiry involving a serial killer, who is randomly attacking young women, apparently without motive. Two series of the programme were produced. The first was produced by HTV, and the second by Meridian Broadcasting. Both series aired consecutively between 2 October 2000 and 1 November 2001. Both series were issued on DVD on 11 October 2011, exclusively in the United States by Acorn Media.

Plot
Detective Constable Jack Mowbray (Ross Kemp) investigates when the brutal murder of a young woman in Bristol sets off a chain of events, which unbeknown to him, threaten to tear his family apart and change the course of his live forever. When the Bristol murder is linked to a series of recent killings, known as the 'M4 Murders', the investigating team grows to more than a dozen detectives, and just as many petty jealousies and full-blown rivalries. Mowbray’s boss, Detective Chief Superintendent Derek Henderson (Kenneth Cranham), keeps the pressure on as it becomes clear that the latest killing will not be the last. With little clue or pattern to suggest the identity of the killer, the team are forced to a race against time to find the predator before he strikes again — without apparent motive.

Mowbray's main sidekick is DC Jim Boulter (Jamie Foreman), a no-nonsense detective who is prepared to stop at nothing to get to the truth. He often comes close to crossing the line when interrogating suspects, often forcing Mowbray or his other fellow colleagues to intervene. Other officers on the enquiry include DI Monty Fowler (Sean Murray), a long-time close friend of Derek Henderson, who is drafted in to lead up one side of the enquiry at Henderson's request. The other senior investigating detective, DI Keith Champan (John Telfer) was specially selected by Assistant Chief Commissioner Ronald Stocks (Ian Bartholomew), who has overall control of the investigation. Chapman's team also consists of WPC Margaret Walkinshaw (Jane Hazlegrove), a rookie officer barely out of her probation period, and DCs Mickey Lloyd (David Kennedy) and Phil Leighton (William Bateman). Fowler's team also consists of DC Linda Harris (Lou Gish) and DC Trevor Richard (Howard Saddler). Henderson's main adversary, Detective Chief Superintendent Huw Owen (Robert Blythe), is the initial investigating officer on the case. When Owen comes close to blowing the investigation, Stocks decides to replace him with Henderson. However, Henderson later comes close to being sidelined himself, until the team identify Robert Jackson (Karl Johnson) as the prime suspect for the murders.

Although Jackson is initially arrested by Mowbray, Henderson makes the shock decision to release him without charge. When two further attacks occur, one of which results in a further murder, Jackson is re-arrested and eventually charged. In the beginning of the second series, Jackson is convicted of the murders, but when a subsequent attack takes place, with exactly the same modus operandi, the team suspect a copycat killer - although Fowler and Mowbray suspect that Jackson may not have been their man after all. When a civil case is brought against Mowbray and Henderson for misconduct, Mowbray discovers that vital evidence against Jackson was not discovered during the course of the initial investigation.

Cast
 Ross Kemp as DC Jack Mowbray
 Kenneth Cranham as DCS Derek Henderson
 Jamie Foreman as DC Jim Boulter
 Lou Gish as DC/DS Linda Harris
 Sean Murray as DI Monty Fowler
 Howard Saddler as DC Trevor Richard
 Karl Johnson as Robert Jackson
 Hazel Ellerby as Sally Mowbray
 Claire Huckle as Paula Mowbray
 Buster Reece as Stuart Mowbray
 Jane Hazlegrove as WPC/DC Margaret Walkinshaw (1.1 — 2.4)
 John Telfer as DI Keith Chapman (1.1 — 2.2)
 David Kennedy as DC Mickey Lloyd (1.1 — 1.6)
 William Bateman as DC Phil Leighton (1.1 — 1.6)
 Simon Bowen as DC Collins (1.1 — 1.6)
 Robert Blythe as DCS Huw Owen (1.1 — 1.6, 2.5)
 Ian Bartholomew as ACC Ronnie Stocks (1.1 — 2.4)
 William Armstrong as ACC David Ashdown (2.4 — 2.6)
 Tony Melody as Robert Jackson Snr. (2.2 — 2.6)

Episode list

Series 1 (2000)

Series 2 (2001)

References

External links
 

2000 British television series debuts
2001 British television series endings
2000s British crime drama television series
ITV television dramas
English-language television shows
Television series by ITV Studios
Television series produced at Pinewood Studios
Television shows set in Bristol
Television shows produced by Harlech Television (HTV)
Television shows produced by Meridian Broadcasting